Keveri may refer to either of two Papuan languages of New Guinea:
Bauwaki language
Nawaru language